Romani Rose (born 1946 at Heidelberg, Germany) is a Romany activist and head of the Central Council of German Sinti and Roma. He lost 13 relatives in the Holocaust.

Career
Rose was born in Heidelberg in 1946. Until 1982 he lived there as an independent businessman. At the founding of the Central Council in 1982 he was voted to the position of Chairman by the delegates of the member organisations – then nine, now 16 state and regional associations – and since then has been confirmed in his post every four years at the member meetings. From 1991 Rose took over the management of the Documentation and Culture Centre of German Sinti and Roma in Heidelberg. For years he has been known by the federal and state governments for his resoluteness and for his persistent and unyielding work.

Together with the Chairpersons of the national minorities in Germany Rose leads the Minority Council, which was founded on September 9, 2004. It is the union of the umbrella organisations of the four national minorities which belong to the German nation and have always been resident and autochthonous here: The DOMOWINA of the Sorbs, the Friesian Council, the South Schleswig Association of the Danish minority, and the Central Council of German Sinti and Roma. Along with delegates of minorities from the USA, Mexico, Argentina, Japan, India, Sri Lanka, France and Holland Rose is also a member of the management committee of the International Movement Against Discrimination and Racism (IMADR) founded in Tokyo in 1988.

A considerable motivation for Rose's efforts is his personal connection to the past. Thirteen direct relatives of Romani Rose were murdered in concentration camps under National Socialism, including his grandparents in the camps Auschwitz and Ravensbrueck. His father, Oskar Rose, survived on the run and in the underground. Romani Rose's uncle, Vincenz Rose, survived the extermination camp Auschwitz, medical experiments in the Natzweiler concentration camp, and slave work for Daimler-Benz in the tunnels of the KZ Neckarelz/Obrigheim. In 1972 Vincenz Rose founded the first self organisation of German Sinti, the Central Committee of Sinti in West Germany, in which the then not even 13 year old Romani Rose helped out.

Since June 1979 he has led the work for the civil rights of German Sinti and Roma before the eyes of the German as well as the international public; he has also fought for their protection from racism and discrimination, for compensation for the survivors of the Holocaust – at the same time announcing the magnitude and the historical importance of the genocide of 500,000 Sinti and Roma in National Socialist occupied Europe. In May 1995, in cooperation with the member organisations of the Central Council, Rose achieved recognition for German Sinti and Roma as a national minority in Germany with their own minority language, connected with their goal of equal participation in social and political life.

Rose was also one of the driving forces behind the Memorial to the Sinti and Roma Victims of National Socialism in Berlin.

Other activities
 German Institute for Human Rights (DIMR), Member of the Board of Trustees
 Culture Foundation of the German Football Association (DFB), Member of the Board of Trustees
 Federal Anti-Discrimination Agency (ADS), Member of the Advisory Board
 Manfred Lautenschläger Foundation, Member of the Board of Trustees
 Munich Documentation Centre for the History of National Socialism, Member of the Board of Trustees

References

External links 
Romani Rose Biography in English
Dokumentations- und Kulturzentrum Deutscher Sinti und Roma, Homepage (germ.)
 Biografie bei zentralrat.sintiundroma.de/ (PDF,  germ.)
Sinti and Roma newsroom website

German activists
Romani activists
German Romani people
1946 births
Living people
Commanders Crosses of the Order of Merit of the Federal Republic of Germany